This article is a comparison of the Nordic countries.

Geography

Demographics

Source: United Nations Department of Economic and Social Affairs: Population Division (October 2019).

Politics

Government

International organisation membership

a Denmark, Norway and Sweden were among the founders of the predecessor of the OECD, the OEEC, in 1948

Economy

Source: (IMF) International Monetary Fund 2018

Telecommunication

See also

Comparison of the Baltic states
Comparison of the Benelux countries

Notes

References

Nordic countries